Hesba Stretton was the pseudonym of Sarah Smith (27 July 1832 – 8 October 1911), an evangelical English author of religious books for children. These were highly popular. By the late 19th century Jessica's First Prayer had sold a million and a half copies – ten times more than Alice in Wonderland. She concocted "Hesba Stretton" from the initials of herself and four surviving siblings, along with the name of a Shropshire village she visited, All Stretton, where her sister Anne owned a house, Caradoc Lodge.

Early life
Sarah Smith was the daughter of a bookseller, Benjamin Smith (1793–1878) of Wellington, Shropshire and his wife Anne Bakewell Smith (1798–1842), a noted Methodist. She and her elder sister attended the Old Hall, a school in the town, but were largely self-educated.

About 1867, Sarah Smith moved south to live at Snaresbrook and Loughton near Epping Forest, and at Ham, near Richmond, Surrey.

Writing
Smith was one of the most popular Evangelical writers of the 19th century, who used her "Christian principles as a protest against specific social evils in her children's books." Her moral tales and semi-religious stories, chiefly for the young, were printed in huge numbers and often chosen as school and Sunday-school prizes. She became a regular contributor to Household Words and All the Year Round under Charles Dickens's editorship, after her sister had successfully submitted a story of hers without her knowledge. Altogether she wrote more than 40 novels.

The book that won widespread fame for "Hesbah Stretton" was Jessica's First Prayer, first published in the journal Sunday at Home in 1866 and the following year in book form. By the end of the 19th century it had sold at least a million and a half copies. Critic Brian Alderson notes that its sales were "nearly ten times as many as those of Alice in Wonderland." The book gave rise to a genre of stories about homeless children "that successfully combined elements of the sensational novel and the religious tract and helped introduce the image of the poor, urban child into the Victorian social conscious." It has been published in the United States as part of the Lamplighter Family Collection, under the title Jessica's Journey.

A sequel, Jessica's Mother, was published in Sunday at Home in 1866 and as a book in 1904. Jessica is a homeless girl in Victorian London, abandoned by an alcoholic actress mother, but who finds comfort and religious support in a friendship with Daniel Standring, owner of a coffee stall. She appears as a child actress, but when she becomes too big for such parts, she is beaten by her mother, receives little to eat, and wanders about London. The act of humanity by Standring, a chapel keeper in a Methodist chapel, helps him too, by re-evaluating his concept of religion and respectability. Other authors who followed the tradition of stories about "street arabs" and the importance of philanthropy to the poor include Georgina Castle Smith.

Smith became the chief writer for the Religious Tract Society. Her experience of working with slum children in Manchester in the 1860s gave her books a greater sense of authenticity, for they "drive home the abject state of the poor with almost brutal force."

Social work

In 1884, Smith was one of the co-founders (with Benjamin Waugh, Baroness Burdett-Coutts, Lord Shaftesbury and others) of the London Society for the Prevention of Cruelty to Children, which combined with similar societies in other cities such as Manchester to form the National Society for the Prevention of Cruelty to Children some five years later. However, she (and Burdett-Coutts) resigned after a decade in protest against what she saw as financial mismanagement.

In retirement in Richmond, Surrey, the Smith sisters ran a branch of the Popular Book Club for working-class readers. Sarah died after a long illness at home at Ivycroft on Ham Common, to which she moved in 1890, on 8 October 1911, surviving her sister by only eight months.

Bibliography
Fern's Hollow (1864)
Enoch Roden's Training (1865)
The Children of Cloverly (1865)
Jessica's First Prayer (1866, 1867)
Jessica's Mother (1867, 1904)
Pilgrim Street, a Story of Manchester Life (1867)
Paul's Courtship (1867)
Little Meg's Children (1868)
David Lloyd's Last Will (1869)
Alone in London (1869)
The Doctor's Dilemma (1872)
Pilgrim Street (1872)
Bede's Charity (1872)
Lost Gip (1873)
Michel Lorio's Cross (1873)
Hester Morley's Promise (1873)
Cassy (1874)
Brought Home (1875)
Through a Needle's Eye (1879)
Cobwebs and Cables (1881)
Under the Old Roof (1882)
Half Brothers (1892)
Little Meg's Children (1905)
The Christmas Child (1909)

References

Sources

External links

Biography and ebooks
More on Hesba Stretton's life and how the social scene in her home town of Wellington influenced her writing: Allan Frost: The Life of Hesba Stretton, 1832–1911 (Telford, UK: Wrekin Books, 2008). 

1832 births
1911 deaths
English children's writers
Writers from Shropshire
Victorian novelists
Victorian women writers
19th-century British novelists
19th-century British women writers
19th-century British writers
British women novelists
National Society for the Prevention of Cruelty to Children people
People from Epping Forest District
Pseudonymous women writers
19th-century pseudonymous writers
Burials at St Andrew's Church, Ham